Roger Awan-Scully, also known as Roger Scully, is a British political scientist and academic. He has authored numerous books including: Becoming Europeans? Attitudes, Behaviour, and Socialization in the European Parliament, and co-authored Representing Europe’s Citizens? Electoral Institutions and the Failure of Parliamentary Representation in Europe and Wales Says Yes: Devolution and the 2011 Welsh Referendum. He is full professor of political science at the School of Law and Politics of Cardiff University. He is principal investigator for the ESRC-funded 2016 Welsh Election Study. Scully studied at the University of Lancaster and the University of Durham, and earned a PhD from Ohio State University. He was lecturer in European politics at Brunel University from 1997 to 1999, and joined Aberystwyth University in January 2000. At Aberystwyth, he was promoted to senior lecturer (2004) and reader (2006), before becoming professor of political science in 2007.

Awards and distinctions
Scully was elected an Academician of the Academy of Social Sciences (FAcSS) in 2010, and a Fellow of the Learned Society of Wales (FLSW) in 2011. He is also a Fellow of the Royal Statistical Society. He was awarded the Political Studies Association’s award for Political Studies Communicator of the Year 2017.

Media
Scully also writes for the New Statesman and talks about elections and politics on Sky News, BBC Wales, World Service, NPR, Channel 4, News Channel, LBC, BBC Radio 4, BBC Radio 5 Live, ITV, and ABC. In 2013 he started a blog entitled Elections in Wales, on which he discusses electoral politics and political representation.

Selected works
 
 
 
 
 
 Awan-Scully, Roger (2018) The End of British Party Politics. London Biteback Publishing.

References

Living people
British political scientists
European Union and European integration scholars
Fellows of the Academy of Social Sciences
Fellows of the Learned Society of Wales
Fellows of the Royal Statistical Society
Academics of Cardiff University
Year of birth missing (living people)
Alumni of Durham University